Stepan Dimitrov (born 10 December 1995) is a Moldovan taekwondo athlete. He represented Moldova in several international competitions and tournaments, winning two medals in the European Taekwondo Championships: gold medal in 2014 and a bronze in 2018.

Achievements

References

1995 births
Moldovan male taekwondo practitioners
Living people
European Games competitors for Moldova
Taekwondo practitioners at the 2015 European Games
European Taekwondo Championships medalists